Gotzon Mantuliz Dudagoitia (born August 10, 1988 in Getxo, Vizcaya, Basque Country) is a designer, model, TV commentator/presenter and winner of the 5th edition of the well known Spanish television show “El Conquistador del Fin del Mundo.” The show is broadcast on ETB2, the second television channel of Euskal Telebista (ETB), the Basque public television channel. Following his success, Dudagoitia started working as a commentator in the debate of “El Conquistador del Fin del Mundo”, called “El Conquis: La Aventura” and directed by Patxi Alonso, a Basque journalist. In 2015 he was premiered as a TV presenter with the program “Safari Wazungu”. He has also published a book called “Gotzon Mantuliz. Diario de un conquistador.”

Early life and education 
Gotzon Mantuliz Dudagoitia was born August 10, 1988 in Getxo, Vizcaya, Basque Country, but resides in Berango from his early childhood. He attended primary, secondary and high school education in Gaztelueta in Leioa. He completed his university studies at the School of Nursing of Leioa University of the Basque Country (UPV), from which he holds a diploma in nursing since 2010. When he was 16, he travelled to Ireland for 2 months and worked in a supermarket. He has always combined studies with different type of works.

He has been a painter, worked in a surf shop, as a waiter in a major club in the Basque Country and The Image Club, as a graphic designer and as an adventure travel guide for Marco Polo Club agency, among other things. His interest in clothes and design led him to embark on a new project: the creation of an ecological footprint that is called hakao and which allocates part of the profits to fight for charitable causes in favor of the environment and animals. Travelling has become another of his interests. He has travelled much of Europe, Turkey, Costa Rica, Argentina, Jamaica, Thailand and other remote places.

El Conquistador del Fin del Mundo 5ª Edición (2009) 
In 2009, with just 19 years, he joined the most successful program of ETB, El conquistador del fin del mundo. 
At the broadcasting of the final, up to 500,000 spectators watched the show during the two and a half hours that it lasted. Gotzon became a well-known image in the Basque region, and the audience recognized him as the favorite audience participant with the 85% of votes.
Over the next few weeks, Gotzon visited most of the sets of the Basque television, gave interviews to the main news of the Basque Country and his image became an attraction.

Gotzon Mantuliz. Diario de un conquistador 
His time in the contest opened doors to new projects, like collecting his experience on the reality of adventure in a book. With the help of Gorka Larrumbide, a basque journalist who shaped the history of the novel, Gotzon published his first novel, “Gotzon Mantuliz. Diario de un Conquistador”, in 2010. It was a best-seller in the Basque Country, being for several weeks in the list of the best selling books and receiving rave reviews from the press.

Activity as a model 
His image led him to start modeling, collaborating and working with some of the most important photographers of the time, Lucho Rengifo, Pedro Usabiaga and Carlos Hernandez. Gotzon has collaborated with brands such as Hugo Boss and Xtg, and has been the advertising face of brands such as Vans and Reef. A few years ago now, he participated in solidarity parades as a model posing with clothing for sport brands such as Nike. For two years, he was the face of the launch of the Euskaltel orange shirt for the Tour de France, and has also served as a judge in the Miss and Mister Euskadi contest. Gotzon was image of the advertising campaign conducted by El Diario Vasco lending his image for promotional shirts of “El Conquistador del Fin del Mundo”, which quickly sold out.

TV collaborations 
In 2011, he combined his job as a model with working in one of the most successful programs of EITB “El Conquis: La aventura”. Each week he had his own section in the program called “El juego del Conquistador”, which was presented through the website. He received several proposals to participate in Supervivientes (España) 2011, a reality show emitted in Telecinco. However, he rejected the offer because he didn´t like the factors such as visiting other programs of the TV channel that lend themselves to discussion and conflict once the adventure has finished.
He travelled with the team of “El Conquistador del Fin del Mundo” to test the activities and interview the participants, which was shown in the debate with his section “GotzON”. In 2015 he was premiered as a TV presenter with the program “Safari Wazungu”, which was cancelled due to its poor ratings.

AventúraT 
His adventurous spirit led him to create, from its official website a section called 'AventúraT' where his followers propose challenges to overcome and he is posing with powerful and spectacular videos and photos. It has already swum between shark has eaten insects in Thailand, was launched into space from a bridge 65 meters carrying Goming or have flown the Biscay coast paragliding, among other things.

 Season 1
 Diving with sharks
 Thai delicacies
 Paragliding
 Puenting and Goming
 Guarrindongadas with David de Jorge

Television 

El Conquistador del Fin del Mundo (2009)
"Aconcagua: la aventura" (2010)
Ni más ni menos (2010)
Vaya Semanita (2010)
El Conquis: la aventura (2011) 
El juego del Conquistador (2011)
Atrápame si puedes (2014)
Commentator in "El Conquis: la aventura" (2011–Present)
Safari Wazungu (2015 - 2016)
Operación Triunfo 2018

Bibliography 
 "Gotzon Mantuliz. Diario de un conquistador" (By Gorka Larrumbide in 2010)

References 

http://www.gotzonmantuliz.com/biografia.htm 
https://archive.today/20130308044450/http://www.deia.com/2010/02/09/ocio-y-cultura/comunicaci%C3%B3n/diario-de-un-conquistador-aventuras-desventuras-y-exitos-de-gotzon-mantuliz-en-el-fin-del-mundo-2
http://www.eitb.eus/es/television/programas/el-conquistador/videos/detalle/2863600/video-gotzon-mantuliz-nos-mostrara-otro-lado-conquis-eitbeus/
https://archive.today/20130411123620/http://www.noticiasdealava.com/2011/02/11/ocio-y-cultura/comunicacion/gotzon-mantuliz-el-gran-conquistador-en-on
http://www.agapea.com/libros/GOTZON-MANTULIZ-DIARIO-DE-UN-CONQUISTADOR-isbn-8499232248-i.htm
https://web.archive.org/web/20160304045249/http://www.noticiasdealava.com/2015/02/02/ocio-y-cultura/comunicacion/viajar-sin-adversidad-son-unas-vacaciones-no-una-aventura

External links
 Official Website of Gotzon Mantuliz 
 Personal Channel of Gotzon Mantuliz in YouTube

1988 births
Living people
Spanish television presenters
Spanish women television presenters
Spanish male models
Spanish designers